Postal Savings Bank of China Co., Ltd. also known as PSBC is a  commercial retail bank founded in 2007 and headquartered in Beijing. It provides basic financial services, especially to small and medium enterprises, rural and low income customers. As of December 31, 2017, PSBC has 39,798 branches covering all regions of China.

PSBC was set up with an initial capital of RMB20 billion in 2007 from the State Post Bureau. Today it has RMB1.5 trillion in deposits and the second largest number of branches, after the Agricultural Bank of China.

During the Global Financial Crisis, the government took several measures to spread its national economic stimulus plan specifically to rural areas.  This included using microfinance services provided by the Postal Savings Bank as a tool for national development and poverty reduction. The bank with its extremely broad reach also assists China’s credit cooperatives in their microcredit schemes.

On December 8, 2015, China Postal Savings Bank, through issuing pro-float stock, received an injection of investment from the Temasek Holdings of Singapore, UBS, the Canada Pension Plan Investment Board, the International Finance Corporation, Morgan Stanley, DBS Bank, Tencent, Ant Financial Services Group, China Life and China Telecom, with a total investment of 45.1 billion yuan. These "strategic investors" together held a 16.92% stake in the company at the time of purchase. The stock was listed through an initial public offering on the Stock Exchange of Hong Kong on September 30, 2016. Prior to its listing, it was the largest unlisted Chinese bank.

Xuewen Zhang and Hong Lao serve as Vice Presidents of the bank and co-executive directors.

See also

 Postal savings system

References

External links 
official website

Companies listed on the Hong Kong Stock Exchange
Banks of China
Microfinance organizations
Banks established in 2007
China Post
2016 initial public offerings
Postal savings system
2007 establishments in China